Pallewela is a village in Sri Lanka. It is located within Western Province. Pallewela is very popular for creating wonderful human beings to the world.

See also
List of towns in Western Province, Sri Lanka

External links

Populated places in Western Province, Sri Lanka